Australian Red Cross Lifeblood, simply known as Lifeblood, is a branch of the Australian Red Cross responsible for the collection and distribution of blood and biological products in Australia. Lifeblood employs around 3,700 employees across scientific, clinical and support services, processing over half a million blood donations each year. Lifeblood is primarily funded by the Australian Government and state and territory governments.

History
The Red Cross' Australian blood services were initially managed by state-level organisations.  Victoria's Blood Transfusion Service was founded in 1929 by Hematologist Lucy Meredith Bryce, who was the founding director from 1929 to 1954 of the then Victorian Red Cross, and by 1941 each state had its own Organ Transfusion Service. Also in 1941, the National Emergency Blood Transfusion Service (later the National Blood Transfusion Committee) was formed to coordinate the state groups. In 1945, the Red Cross took over blood and serum preparation units established by the Australian Army.

In 1995, a government report recommended the foundation of a separate national structure, and the Australian Red Cross Blood Service was formed in 1996, encompassing the old state and territory blood donation/transfusion services.

On 15 November 2019, the Australian Red Cross Blood Service changed its name and branding to Australian Red Cross Lifeblood, citing its increasing responsibility for non-blood products such as microbiota, tissue and organs and breast milk.

Relationship with CSL
Australian Red Cross Lifeblood and its predecessors had a long-standing relationship with the Commonwealth Serum Laboratories (CSL), a government medical body founded in 1916. The Blood Service supplied CSL with donated blood for use in research and manufacture of medical products (e.g. serum for transfusion).

In 1994, CSL was privatised, becoming CSL Limited. The Australian Red Cross Blood Service continued to supply CSL with donated blood.

Infectious diseases
Blood donated in Australia has been tested for hepatitis B since 1972, HIV-1 since 1985, hepatitis C since 1990, HIV-2 since 1992/3, and HTLV-1 since 1993.

As with other blood transfusion services, the Red Cross has had to strike a balance between protecting blood recipients against infection, and accepting enough donors to maintain an adequate supply of blood. This has led to debate over which categories of potential donors should be excluded.

In 2003, a federal government report found that despite the introduction of hepatitis C screening from February 1990, infected donors were told to keep donating until July of that same year; a total of 20,000 people were estimated to have been infected with hepatitis C via blood products. Some infected blood was given to CSL and may have been used in thousands of CSL products, although it has not been shown that any of these products caused infection in the recipients.

The service has a policy of barring men who have had sex with men (MSM) during the previous twelve months from donating blood (an earlier policy had excluded any men who had had sex with other men since 1980, regardless of time elapsed). This has been the source of ongoing controversy, with a case (in 2008) referred to the Tasmanian Anti-Discrimination Commission. People who have engaged in heterosexual or female-to-female sex during the past 12 months are allowed to give blood. Female-to-female transmission is considered by the Centers for Disease Control to be rare. As well as deferring blood donations from MSM, other categories of sexual activity can also result in a 12-month deferral, such as sex with a prostitute or having a partner who has tested positive to hepatitis B or C.

In 2014, several gay men again requested that the Australian Red Cross Blood Service permit them to donate blood.  The Red Cross, in noting their concern, said they were receptive to a reduction in the current deferral period from 12 to 6 months. However, the Australian Therapeutic Goods Administration rejected their submission, arguing that there would be a greater risk of HIV without a significant increase in blood supply. The Red Cross say they do not defer based on sexuality or relationships, but rather on sexual activity, and for this reason it is not possible to deal with MSM on an individual basis.

In April 2020 the Therapeutic Goods Administration revised the deferral period for MSM down to three months. The revision required approval of the federal, state and territory governments before it could go into effect. The revised policy came into effect on 31 January 2021.

In April 2022, the Therapeutic Goods Administration accepted the submission of Lifeblood and the University of New South Wales and removed the rule that made people who had lived in the United Kingdom for more than six months between 1980 and 1996. Before the change came into effect in July 2022, these donors were unable to donate due to the risk of human variant Creutzfeldt–Jakob disease (vCJD, or "mad cow disease") exposure.

See also
 Blood donation restrictions on men who have sex with men
 Creutzfeldt–Jakob disease

References

External links
 
 Lifeblood website for health professionals

Blood donation
Medical and health organisations based in Australia